Pettifleur Berenger (born 20 December 1964) is an Australian author and reality television personality of Sri Lankan / Ceylonese Dutch Burgher descent. She appeared on The Real Housewives of Melbourne in its second and third seasons. She released her first book, Switch the Bitch, in April 2015.

Biography 
Berenger appeared as a contestant on Hell's Kitchen Australia, which premiered in 2017. She finished in ninth place, being the second one eliminated.

In January 2021, Berenger was a contestant in the Australian version of I'm a Celebrity...Get Me Out of Here!, where she was eliminated second.

Personal life
Berenger has three sons from a previous relationship. , Berenger's partner was Frank Palazzo.

References

External links 

 Pettifleur.com

Australian television personalities
Women television personalities
Living people
Burgher people
The Real Housewives cast members
1964 births
Participants in Australian reality television series
People from Colombo
Real estate and property developers
Sri Lankan emigrants to Australia
I'm a Celebrity...Get Me Out of Here! (Australian TV series) participants
Australian women writers
The Real Housewives of Melbourne